Bruce Scholtz (born September 26, 1958) is a former professional American football player who played linebacker for seven seasons for the Seattle Seahawks and one season for the New England Patriots.

Scholtz attended David Crockett High School in Austin, Texas. During his senior year, he was a captain of the varsity football team and played as both linebacker and center. He won the Central Texas 26AAAA Defensive Player of the Year award. Scholtz also played on the varsity basketball team. He averaged 19 points per game and led the team in rebounding. He graduated from Crockett in 1977 and attended the University of Texas at Austin. He was drafted in 1982, Round 2, Pick 6 (33 Overall) by the Seattle Seahawks.

References

1958 births
Living people
People from La Grange, Texas
American football linebackers
Seattle Seahawks players
New England Patriots players
Texas Longhorns football players
Ed Block Courage Award recipients